Myoxanthus punctatus is a species of orchid occurring from Mexico to Guyana.

References

External links 

punctatus
Orchids of Guyana
Orchids of Mexico